Boris Quercia Martinic (born 31 August 1967) is a Chilean actor, director, writer, and producer. As a filmmaker, his first feature film Sex with Love received several national and international awards. As a television director, Los 80 has become one of the most successful Chilean series since its premiere in 2008. And as a writer he has won the Grand Prix of Crime Fiction in France with his second novel, Perro muerto.

Biography
The son of actor Benito Quercia, Boris studied acting at the University of Chile.

Later he joined the company Teatro Sombrero Verde, under the direction of Willy Semler.

His career as a film director began with the short film Ñoquis (1995), shot in 16 mm format, followed by El lanza (1997) in 35 mm. In 2000 he premiered L.S.D., the first Chilean film recorded in digital format. Three years later his first feature film, Sex with Love, was released, for which he won the Altazor Award as best director, as well as several other international awards for best film and direction. In 2006 he released his second feature film, . Quercia has been the screenwriter of all his films.

In television, he directed the first five seasons (2008–2012) of Los 80, which became one of the most successful series in Chile. About this change, he says that when he was invited to participate in the casting he felt insecure because he had never played the role of conqueror. "Well, I did the casting the same and they liked it and they insisted that I do the character. The problem is that I was going to run into Los 80 and I had to make a very complicated decision, because I feel very good about that project. Somehow, I did five seasons as a director, I wrote several scripts, then it was complicated."

In 2010 Quercia published his first novel, Santiago Quiñones, tira. About his writing career, he said in 2013: "I have to find more spaces to devote myself to writing, but it is one of the things that I am most passionate about, and the experience of the novel was very good. I liked it a lot. Furthermore, I think it built a character that I could follow in other instances."

His second detective novel was released in France in 2015, Perro muerto (Tant de chiens, translated by Isabel Siklodi, Editorial Asphalte) starring the same character, PDI detective Santiago Quiñones. The following year, the book won that country's Grand Prix of Crime Fiction in the Foreign Novel category. This award, which in French is called Grand prix du roman noir, has been given annually since 2009 within the framework of the Beaune International Film Festival.

Quercia plans to create a trilogy with his detective, with whom he also wants to make a television series.

His brother Antonio is a director of photography, and they have worked together on several projects, including the series El hombre de tu vida.

Works

Film

Actor

Director
 1995 – Ñoquis (short)
 1997 – El lanza (short)
 2000 – L.S.D
 2003 – Sex with Love
 2006 –

Screenwriter
 1995 – Ñoquis (short)
 1997 – El lanza (short)
 1999 – 
 2000 – L.S.D
 2003 – Sex with Love
 2006 – 
 2008 – Chile puede

Producer
 1997 – El lanza (short)
 2006 – Kiltro

Television

Actor
 1991 – , as Manolo
 1995 – Matías, el cuentacuentos, as Matías
 1995 – El amor está de moda, as Domingo
 1996 – , as Ciro Chaquib
 1996 – Vecinos puertas adentro, as Eugenio
 1997 – , as Alejandro Llich
 1998 – , as José Ignacio Bermúdez
 1999 – , as Gino Mackenzie
 2000 – , as Fidel Castro Castro
 2013 – , as Hugo Canales
 2015 – Entre caníbales, as Samuel Amerman

Director
 2004 – 
 2007 – 
 2008 – Los 80 – 1st season
 2009 – Los 80 – 2nd season
 2010 – Los 80 – 3rd season
 2011 – Los 80 – 4th season
 2012 – Los 80 – 5th season

Books
 2008 – Sex with Love, screenwriter of the film of the same name (Ocho Libros Editores)
 2014 – Santiago Quiñones, tira (Random House Mondadori; translated into French by Baptiste Chardon as Les Rues de Santiago)
 2015 – Perro muerto (translated into French by Isabel Siklodi as Tant de chiens)

Awards

References

External links
 

1967 births
20th-century Chilean male actors
21st-century Chilean male actors
Chilean film directors
Chilean male film actors
Chilean male stage actors
Chilean male telenovela actors
Chilean people of Croatian descent
Chilean people of Italian descent
Chilean screenwriters
Male screenwriters
Living people
Male actors from Santiago
Chilean television directors
University of Chile alumni